Steve W. Troxler (born 1952) is an American farmer and Republican politician. He serves as the Commissioner of Agriculture and Consumer Services for North Carolina. Because of a contested election due to lost ballots in the November 2004 statewide election, he was not sworn in until February 8, 2005. He was re-elected in 2008, 2012, 2016 and 2020.

Biography
Troxler was born and grew up in Browns Summit, North Carolina, where he attended local schools. He studied conservation at North Carolina State University, earning a bachelor's degree in 1974.

Troxler originally leased farmland in Browns Summit before he purchased some after he got his degree and primarily grew tobacco. After he was elected to office, he planted less tobacco in favor of wheat and produce.

Political career 
Troxler was originally a member of the Democratic Party, but left the organization in the late 1990s, feeling that Democrats were hostile to tobacco production. Jerry Blackwelder, a Republican Party consultant, recruited him as a candidate for the office of North Carolina Commissioner of Agriculture. Troxler ran in 2000, losing to Meg Scott Phipps. Due to a financial corruption scandal, Phipps was replaced by Democrat Britt Cobb in 2003.

Troxler ran again for the same position in the 2004 Council of State election, finishing 2,287 votes ahead of incumbent Cobb. However, because more than 4,000 votes were lost in Carteret County, the race was unresolved for more than three months. After extended legal challenges between Cobb and Troxler, Cobb conceded the race on February 4, 2005.

Troxler was sworn in as North Carolina Agriculture Commissioner on February 8, 2005. He was the first Republican to be elected as Agriculture Commissioner in the state's history, reflecting the ascendancy of the party in the state. After his inauguration at the North Carolina State Fairgrounds, Troxler rode a tractor to his downtown offices. Troxler was re-elected in 2008 as Commissioner of Agriculture and Consumer Services for the state of North Carolina. As of 2021 he is currently serving his fifth term.

Because of a state law passed in 2013 that expanded venues for carrying legally permitted weapons, in 2014 a gun owners group challenged the no-guns policy of the North Carolina State Fair. Troxler enforced the ban that year while court cases were litigated. A Wake County Superior Court upheld the ban at the fair later that year. By early 2015, some legislators introduced bills to allow guns, while others introduced a bill to maintain the ban on carrying guns at the fair. The ban continues as of 2021.

Electoral history

References

External links
 North Carolina Department of Agriculture and Consumer Services website

1952 births
Living people
North Carolina Commissioners of Agriculture
North Carolina Republicans
North Carolina State University alumni
People from Browns Summit, North Carolina